Venables is a former commune of the Eure department in Normandy in northern France. On 1 January 2017, it was merged into the new commune Les Trois Lacs.

History

The village of Venables dates back some 7,000 years. It is situated at the northernmost point of the Madrie Plateau, at an altitude of 124 meters above sea level. The soil consists of alluvium, white chalk, clay, and sand.  It overlooks the meandering of the Seine River and is built at the crossroads coming from Les Andelys to the north, Gaillon to the east, Louviers to the south, while the western border of the village is protected by the banks of the Seine.

The main village is located at the top of the hill and centers around the town church. It also contains the village elementary school and La Mairie (town hall). The hamlets include:  La Mare (Hamlet of the pond) located in the valley below the main village; La Rive (Hamlet on the River Bank) located along the banks of the Seine; Lormais which is nestled between the Seine river and the hills; Moulin a Vent (Hamlet of the Windmill) located at the edge of the Madrie Plateau; Val d'Ailly (Hamlet of the Ailly Valley) where only a 16th-century manor house and its surrounding farm remain which was a residence of the Charadas families and Mangin (a French naval officer at the turn of the century); and lastly Fontaine-La-Verte (Hamlet of the Green Fountain) which derives its name from the many springs that flow through the flowering ground cover.

Population

See also
Communes of the Eure department

References

External links

Former communes of Eure